Haynes King may refer to:

Haynes King (painter) (1831–1904), English genre painter
Haynes King (American football), American football quarterback